Sutton and Hollesley Heaths is a  biological Site of Special Scientific Interest south-east of Woodbridge in Suffolk. Most of the site is managed by the Suffolk Wildlife Trust as Sutton and Hollesley Commons. It is part of the Sandlings Special Protection Area under the European Union Directive on the Conservation of Wild Birds, and the Suffolk Coast and Heaths Area of Outstanding Natural Beauty.

These remnants of the formerly extensive sandy heaths of the Suffolk coast consist of dry grass and heather heathland, together with areas of bracken, scrub and pine and birch woodland. Breeding birds include long-eared owls, and hen harriers roost there in the winter.

There is access to the site from Heath Road.

References

Sites of Special Scientific Interest in Suffolk